PICO 4 is a virtual reality headset developed by ByteDance. It is designed for virtual reality games and is only available in Europe and East Asia (China, South Korea, Japan and Singapore). It is currently not available in the United States. PICO 4 is Meta Quest 2 competitor.

The Pico 4 uses pancake lenses in combination with two small LCD displays  one for each eye in the head mounted display. This technology allows for a lighter headset with an increased image resolution. 
The pancake lenses have some drawbacks introduced by the light bouncing between the lens layers, but are generally considered to have less artifacts than the previously used fresnel lens.
There are a few features that have been introduced in this product, real time hand tracking and a see through mode in low resolution.

Images

References 

Products introduced in 2022
Virtual reality headsets
Wearable devices
Metaverse